The Shrine of Venus Cloacina (Sacellum Cloacinae or Sacrum Cloacina) — the "Shrine of Venus of the Sewer" — was a small sanctuary on the Roman Forum, honoring the divinity of the Cloaca Maxima, the spirit of the "Great Drain" or Sewer of Rome. Cloacina, the Etruscan goddess associated with the entrance to the sewer system, was later identified with the Roman goddess Venus for unknown reasons, according to Pliny the Elder.

History

According to legend, the foundation and cult of the Shrine was associated with the Sabine king Titus Tatius, who ruled during the time of Romulus (8th century BC). The Etruscan deity Cloacina may have been associated originally with the small brook, which marked the boundary between the Sabines on the Quirinal Hill and Romans on the Palatine Hill and later became the city's Cloaca Maxima.  Two important episodes from Rome's founding are said to have taken place at this shrine including the purification of the Sabine and Roman armies after a war following and the death of Verginia. According to legend, the father of the virtuous Verginia, using a butcher's knife from one of the stalls of the Tabernae Novae ("new shops"), killed his daughter rather than let her fall victim to the lecherous attentions of Appius Claudius in 449 BC.

The Shrine of Venus Cloacina is first mentioned by the playwright Plautus in the early second century BC. It was located in the Forum in front of the Tabernae Novae  and on the Via Sacra. The Tabernae Novae were replaced by the expanded Basilica Aemilia in the middle Republic (179 BC), but the Shrine was preserved. The round masonry Shrine probably dates from this construction.

Description 

Coins minted during the Second Triumvirate (ca. 42 BC) by a moneyer named Lucius Mussidius Longus give a fairly clear visual representation of the shrine. They show a round sacellum (small, uncovered shrine) with a metal balustrade. The scant archaeological remains uncovered between 1899 and 1901 (round travertine substructure, marble rim, diameter 2.40 meters) conform nicely to the pictures on the coins. In his Natural History (77-79 AD), Pliny the Elder refers to signa Cloacinae, which were evidently the two statues shown on the coins and perhaps some other, unidentified objects. One of the statues is holding or waving an object (possibly a flower). Each statue has a low pillar with a bird on it (flowers and birds were well known attributes of Venus). The two statues may have represented the two aspects of the divinity, Cloacina and Venus.

Religious significance
The Romans believed that a good sewage system was important for the future success of Rome, as a good sewer system was necessary for physical health. Romans cultivated Cloacina as the goddess of purity and the goddess of filth. Cloacina's name is probably derived from the Latin verb cloare (“to purify” or “to clean”), or from cloaca (“sewer)”.

See also
 List of Ancient Roman temples

References

Further reading 
 Essen C. C. van. 1956. “Venus Cloacina.” Mnemosyne IX  137-144.
 Hopkins, John N. 2012. “The « Sacred Sewer » : Tradition and Religion in the Cloaca Maxima.” In Rome, Pollution and Propriety: Dirt, Disease and Hygiene in the Eternal City from Antiquity to Modernity, Edited by Mark Bradley and Kenneth Stow. British School at Rome. Studies, 81-102. Cambridge; New York: Cambridge University Press.

External links 

 Cloacina Sacrum at the Digital Roman Forum

Venus Cloacina
Temples of Venus